Alexis King (born March 31, 1983) is a female American professional tennis player. Before marriage, she was known as Alexis Gordon.

Her career high singles ranking is No. 343 (achieved on July 7, 2008), a ranking which gave her a direct entry into the 2008 Ordina Open – Women's Singles Tournament, where she lost in the first round to New Zealander Marina Erakovic.

This has been King's only appearance at a WTA event yet. She has won three ITF singles titles.

ITF Career Finals

Singles: 5 (3–2)

References
 
 

Living people
1983 births
American female tennis players
21st-century American women